José Manuel Chevela de Souza (born 3 April 1979 in Montijo, Setúbal) is a Portuguese retired professional footballer who played as a forward.

External links

1979 births
Living people
People from Montijo, Portugal
Portuguese footballers
Portuguese sportspeople of Angolan descent
Association football forwards
Liga Portugal 2 players
Segunda Divisão players
Cypriot Second Division players
C.D. Montijo players
F.C. Barreirense players
A.D. Ovarense players
C.D. Aves players
S.C. Dragões Sandinenses players
C.D. Pinhalnovense players
A.D. Sanjoanense players
S.C. Praiense players
APEP FC players
AEP Paphos FC players
Olympiakos Nicosia players
Girabola players
C.R. Caála players
Portuguese expatriate footballers
Expatriate footballers in Cyprus
Expatriate footballers in Germany
Expatriate footballers in Angola
Portuguese expatriate sportspeople in Cyprus
Portuguese expatriate sportspeople in Germany
Portuguese expatriate sportspeople in Angola
Sportspeople from Setúbal District